Copycat is a 1995 American psychological thriller film directed by Jon Amiel and starring Sigourney Weaver, Holly Hunter, and Dermot Mulroney. The score was composed by Christopher Young.

Plot
After giving a guest lecture on criminal psychology at a local university, Dr. Helen Hudson, a respected field expert on serial killers, is cornered in the lecture hall's restroom by one of her previous subjects, Daryll Lee Cullum, who has escaped from prison. He kills a police officer and brutally attacks Helen. Another cop subdues Cullum and he is returned to prison. After the attack, Hudson becomes severely agoraphobic, sealing herself inside an expensive hi-tech apartment, conducting her entire life from behind a computer screen, and assisted by her friend, Andy.

When a wave of murders spreads fear and panic across San Francisco, homicide detective M.J. Monahan and her partner, Reuben Goetz, solicit Helen's expertise. Initially reluctant, Helen soon finds herself drawn into the warped perpetrator's game of wits. As the murders continue, Helen realizes that the elusive assailant draws inspiration from notorious serial killers, including Albert DeSalvo, The Hillside Strangler, David Berkowitz, Jeffrey Dahmer, and Ted Bundy. When the murderer begins contacting and even stalking Helen, she and M.J. realize that he is after them; they then enlist aid from Cullum, who says he knows about the killer.

Helen soon realizes that the copycat killer has been following the list of serial killers in the same order that she presented them in her university lecture the night she was attacked. The two work to figure out where and when he will strike next. Reuben is held hostage and killed in an unrelated shooting incident at the police station, leaving M.J. – now questioning herself after her targeting the shooter’s brachial nerve area failed and he was still able to stand up and fatally shoot Reuben– to continue searching for the serial killer alone.

After Andy is killed in a manner reminiscent of Jeffrey Dahmer, M.J. deduces that the killer is a man named Peter Foley, who has been corresponding with Cullum. After a failed attempt to capture him at his house, M.J. reaches Helen's residence. M.J. discovers Peter has kidnapped Helen and left a video asking M.J. to guess where he has taken Helen. M.J. returns to where Cullum previously attempted to kill her – the lecture hall restroom. Upon arriving, M.J. finds Helen bound, hanged, and gagged in the same manner Cullum previously did. Foley ambushes M.J., rendering her unconscious. As Foley prepares to kill M.J., Helen desperately attempts to save her by sabotaging Foley's carefully replicated crime scene the only way she can: by attempting to hang herself. Foley panics and cuts Helen down, which allows her to escape to the building's roof. Her agoraphobia overtakes her, and Helen finds herself cornered. Accepting her fate, she turns to face Foley. However, just as he is about to kill her, M.J. shoots him in the Brachial nerve, giving him one last chance to surrender. When he pulls his gun back on her, however, she shoots until killing him with a headshot.

Some time later, Cullum writes to another serial killer, instructing him on how to kill Helen, and revealing that he had been aiding Foley all along. Cullum wishes, "happy hunting, partner" to his new proxy in the mission to kill Helen.

Cast

Soundtrack

All tracks composed by Christopher Young, unless otherwise noted.

 "Get Up to This” by New World Beat  
 "Carabu Party” by Steven Ray  
 "Techno Boy” by Silkski (Jerome Evans)  
 "Main Title from Copycat"
 "Stick Him or Shoot Him"
 "Housebound"
 "Silent Screams"
 "Murder's an Art"
 "In Darkness"
 "Take a Life"
 "Next to the Devil"
 "Pastoral Horror"
 "Silhouette"
 "Gallows"
 "Butchers and Bakers"
 "Panic"
 "Who's Afraid"
 "Lay Me Down"
 "The Barber of Seville: Largo al factotum" by Roberto Servile/Failoni Chamber Orchestra/Will Humburg
 "Tosca: Vissi D'arte" by Gabriela Beňačková/The Czech Philharmonic Orchestra/Bohumil Gregor
 "Requiem (Fauré): In Paradisum, Requiem Op. 48" (choral work)

Reception

Critical reception
The film received positive reviews from critics. It holds an approval rating of 75% on Rotten Tomatoes, based on 57 reviews, with an average rating of 6.5/10. The consensus summarizes: "Copycats outstanding cast helps this often unpleasant thriller transcend the less palatable elements of its standard-issue story." Audiences polled by CinemaScore gave the film an average grade of "A−" on an A+ to F scale.

Roger Ebert of the Chicago Sun-Times awarded it three and a half stars out of four, and a "thumbs up" on Siskel & Ebert, citing Holly Hunter's character as "one of the most intriguing and three-dimensional characters of the year".

The film is recognized by American Film Institute in these lists:
 2001: AFI's 100 Years...100 Thrills – Nominated

Box office
The film grossed $32 million in the United States and Canada and $79 million worldwide.

Plagiarism controversy
A 2019 New Yorker article noted that A. J. Finn's bestselling debut novel The Woman in the Window (2018) has the same setup, without attribution, as Copycat. When notified of this, director Jon Amiel said, "Wow. [It's probably] not actionable, but certainly worth noting, and one would have hoped that the author might have noted it himself."

See also
 Copycat crime

References

External links
 
 

1995 films
1995 crime thriller films
1990s mystery thriller films
1990s police films
1990s psychological thriller films
1990s serial killer films
Agoraphobia in fiction
American crime thriller films
American mystery thriller films
American police detective films
American psychological thriller films
American serial killer films
Fictional portrayals of the San Francisco Police Department
Films directed by Jon Amiel
Films scored by Christopher Young
Films set in San Francisco
Films set in the San Francisco Bay Area
Regency Enterprises films
Warner Bros. films
Films produced by Arnon Milchan
1990s English-language films
1990s American films